Neosminthurus clavatus is a species of globular springtails in the family Sminthuridae, found in Mexico and Central America.

References

Collembola
Animals described in 1897